Doctor Schotte (German: Dr. Schotte) is a 1918 German silent drama film directed by William Wauer and starring Albert Bassermann, Elsa Bassermann and Käthe Wittenberg. It was shot at the Weissensee Studios in Berlin.

Cast
 Albert Bassermann
 Elsa Bassermann
 Käthe Wittenberg

References

Bibliography
 Wedel, Michael. Pictorial Affects, Senses of Rupture: On the Poetics and Culture of Popular German Cinema, 1910-1930. Walter de Gruyter, 2019.

External links

1918 films
Films of the German Empire
German silent feature films
Films directed by William Wauer
Medical-themed films
1910s German films
Films shot at Weissensee Studios